Virginia Walbot (born 1946) is an American agriculturalist and botanist who is a professor in the Department of Biology at Stanford University. She investigates maize development with a focus on factors involved in male sterility.<ref>[Wang, Dongxue, David S. Skibbe, and Virginia Walbot. "Maize Male Sterile 8 (Ms8), A Putative Β-1,3-Galactosyltransferase, Modulates Cell Division, Expansion, And Differentiation During Early Maize Anther Development." Plant Reproduction 26.4 (2013): 329-338. Academic Search Premier. Web. 1 Feb. 2014.]</ref>

Life
Walbot first began working with corn when she used to help grow and sell it on her family's farm in Southern California. Later in the 1970s she met Barbara McClintock, who was very influential. That is when Walbot began visiting McClintock's lab in Cold Spring Harbor and became devoted to studying maize development and reproduction.

In 1967, Walbot received a B.A. degree in biology at Stanford University. In 1969–1972, attended Yale to work on embryogenesis, where she earned an M.Phil. and Ph.D. She attended the University of Georgia on a postdoctoral appointment. She became a faculty Member at Washington University in St. Louis. Later Walbot returned to Stanford as a professor in the Department of Biology.

Walbot first worked with maize while working with Ed Coe in the University of Missouri.

Walbot participates in societies including the American Society for Cell Biology, AAAS, AIBS, Genetics Society, and International Society for Plant Molecular Biology

Published two books, Developmental Biology in 1987 and The Maize Handbook'' in 1993.

Walbot has published hundreds of journal articles.

Administrative appointments

Elected to the Steering Committee of the Faculty Senate, Stanford (2009 - 2011)
Elected to Faculty Senate, Stanford (2009–2011)
Elected to Faculty Senate, Stanford (1999–2001)
Committee on Committees, Stanford (2000–2001)
Committee on Research, Stanford (2003–2005)

Honors and awards
Recognized as a Pioneer Member of the American Society of Plant Biologists. 
Corresponding Member, Mexican Academy of Sciences (2004)
Hageman Lectureship, Kansas State University (2001)
Joan V. Wood Lectureship, Indiana University (1999)
Explorer Award, National Geographic Society (1998)
Eppley Award, Eppley Foundation (1993)
Fellow, Guggenheim Foundation (1987)
Belk Award, Miami University of Ohio (1985)
Fellow, American Assn. Advancement of Science (1981)
Postdoctoral Fellowship, NIH (1972–1975)
Predoctoral fellowship, NSF (1969–1972)

References

External links 
 The Walbot Lab at Stanford University
 CV
 

Living people
American agriculturalists
Stanford University faculty
American women botanists
Stanford University Department of Biology faculty
1946 births
21st-century American women